Monmouth College is a private Presbyterian liberal arts college in Monmouth, Illinois. Monmouth enrolls approximately 900 students from 21 countries who choose courses from 40 major programs, 43 minors, and 17 pre-professional programs in a core curriculum.

History

Monmouth College was founded on April 18, 1853, by the Second Presbytery of Illinois of the Associate Reformed Presbyterian Church. The college celebrates this date as "Scholars Day", cancelling classes for a day of celebration and an honors convocation. Founded as "Monmouth Academy," the school became Monmouth College after receiving a charter from the state legislature on September 3, 1856. The college remains affiliated with the Presbyterian Church (USA) and is a member of the Associated Colleges of the Midwest, a consortium of small, private liberal arts colleges. The college's motto "Lux" ("Light") appears on its seal.

The first president, David Wallace built two mission churches in Massachusetts before assuming the Monmouth presidency.

Founded on the eve of the American Civil War, the college immediately faced a serious crisis. The college's campus was still under construction while virtually the entire male student body left for military service. Two hundred and thirty-two students, faculty members, and trustees served in the Civil War. A quarter of them were wounded and one in eight was killed. Two were awarded the Medal of Honor, and Abner C. Harding, a college trustee who raised a regiment composed largely of MC students, was commissioned a brigadier general for his leadership in the defense of Fort Donelson in 1863. President Wallace, believing that the college "must educate, whether there be peace or war," kept classes in session for what was then a primarily female student body.

Monmouth was founded as a coeducational college where women and men had equal access to courses. When veterans returning to the college decided to form fraternities, a group of women was determined not to be outdone, and in 1867 established the first fraternity for women, known today as Pi Beta Phi. Three years later, another well-known women's fraternity, Kappa Kappa Gamma, was founded at Monmouth.

Monmouth College had gained national stature by 1911 as shown by its US government classification where 59 colleges and universities ranked higher and 244 ranked lower (out of a total of 345 top colleges).

World War II posed a crisis to the institution similar to that of the Civil War, as male students began enlisting in the service within a month of the Japanese attack on Pearl Harbor, and soon only a handful remained on campus. Through an arrangement with the Navy Department, the college survived by becoming a U.S. Naval Flight Preparatory School, and later offered a V-5 Navy Academic Refresher Unit program for officers. Courses were taught by Monmouth's liberal arts faculty. The Navy later adopted portions of Monmouth's curriculum for training programs nationwide. More than 2,000 Navy men went through Monmouth College, a number of whom would re-enroll at the college after the war funded by the G.I. Bill.

Monmouth's chemistry department gained national prominence in the 1950s when longtime professor William S. Haldeman was recognized with a major award by the American Chemical Society. The Steelman Report on Manpower for Research noted that Monmouth and four other small colleges—Hope, Juniata, St. Olaf and Oberlin—together had "produced more candidates for the doctor's degree in chemistry than Johns Hopkins, Fordham, Columbia, Tulane and Syracuse Universities combined."

Beginning in the 1960s, a secularization movement changed the nature of the college. Concurrent with dwindling financial support from the United Presbyterian Church, the college removed the Church Synod's role in nominating and confirming trustees, thus opening the door for the cultivation of new trustees with stronger business acumen and financial resources than those during the college's earlier days. The college otherwise maintained its covenant relationship with the Church.

During the Vietnam War, the military draft (and the ability to avoid the draft by enrolling in college) contributed to increases in college attendance throughout the US. Attendance at the college increased but then fell when the draft ended in the 1970s causing financial strain not unlike the losing of students to the Civil War had done in the then distant past.

In 1983, a donation from an alumnus committed $5 million to the endowment and launched a $15 million capital campaign, the largest gift in college history to that point.

During the 1990s, enrollment began a steady increase that would see it more than double over the next two decades, from less than 600 in 1993 to 1,379 in 2009. The endowment also grew substantially, from $23.6 million in 1993 to $87.2 million in 2013. Between 2002 and 2013, more than $120 million was invested in new construction and renovations to the campus.

Presidents

 The Rev. David Alexander Wallace – first president, 1856–1878
 The Rev. Jackson Burgess McMichael – second president, 1878–1897
 The Rev. Samuel Ross Lyons – third president, 1898–1901
 The Rev. Thomas Hanna McMichael – fourth president, 1903–1936
 The Rev. James Harper Grier – fifth president, 1936–1952
 The Rev. Robert W. Gibson – sixth president, 1952–1964
 G. Duncan Wimpress, Jr. – seventh president, 1964–1970
 Richard Dengler Stine – eighth president, 1970–1974
 DeBow Freed – ninth president, 1974–1979
 Bruce Haywood – tenth president, 1980–1994
 Sue Ann Huseman – eleventh president, 1994–1997
 Richard F. Giese – twelfth president, 1997–2005
 Mauri A. Ditzler – thirteenth president, 2005–2014
 Clarence Wyatt – fourteenth president, 2014–present

Affiliations
Monmouth is a founding member of the Associated Colleges of the Midwest and a member of the Annapolis Group of independent liberal arts colleges. Monmouth also continues its relationship with the Presbyterian Church (USA), although courses in religion are no longer required, and is an active member of the Association of Presbyterian Colleges and Universities, of which President Mauri Ditzler served as chair in 2011–2012. Chemistry at Monmouth is an approved baccalaureate program by the American Chemical Society.

Academics and resources

Academic program
Monmouth College offers 34 major fields of study and 18 pre-professional fields of study (with 851 different courses offered) in the sciences, arts, humanities, mathematics, computer sciences, social sciences, foreign languages, classics, and several interdisciplinary fields (including premedical and pre-engineering studies) and provides an unusually integrated core curriculum. This curriculum includes four signature courses designed to aid students in making connections across disciplines and understanding their education as an integrated whole. The curriculum allows freshman students to take advanced classes, and senior students to take introductory courses.

For freshmen, the only course requirement is one of the first-year seminar courses called Introduction to Liberal Arts which are usually limited to 16 students (and never more than 18) and shares a common focus on critical analysis and development of written and oral argument. Besides a first-year seminar course, the other 31 courses (usually four are taken per semester) required for graduation can be elected by the students themselves.

16 percent of Monmouth students in the class of 2013 were double majors. A small number of triple majors and interdisciplinary majors also exist. Within five years of graduation, more than 60 percent of Monmouth alumni attend graduate school or another form of ongoing education.

A survey taken six months after the class of 2012 had graduated, showed that 99% of Monmouth graduates were employed (or were in graduate school); the 2013 and 2014 surveys also showed 99%.

Admission
The Carnegie Foundation classifies Monmouth as a selective institution. For the Class of 2017 (enrolled autumn 2013), Monmouth received 2972 applications and accepted 1914 (64.4%).

In 2014, 54% of students were female and 46% were male. Students came from 30 states and 35 countries. 25% were students of color and 7% were international students.

The transfer admissions process was more selective, with 126 admitted (51.2%) out of 246 applicants for the 2013 autumn semester.

The college uses rolling admissions meaning that once the prospective student's application for admission is complete, a decision is usually made by the college within two weeks.

Associated Colleges of the Midwest consortium
Monmouth is a founding member of the fourteen-member Associated Colleges of the Midwest (ACM) consortium. The colleges share resources and develop and operate common off-campus academic programs. The members of the ACM include some of the finest colleges and universities in the middle west region of the United States and include top-ranked Carleton College and Grinnell College among others.

Resources and facilities

Among the resources on the  campus at Monmouth College are dozens of academic and residential buildings, athletic fields and facilities, three wildlife sanctuaries for the study of ecology, and trails and other areas for hiking. Notable resources include the Shields Collection of antiquities, the largest privately held collection of Native American artifacts in the region, the only direct copy of the Canopus Stone outside of the Cairo Museum, an astronomical observatory, the Mellinger writing center, the Wackerle Career and Leadership center, and some of the finest sporting facilities in any Division III school. The Kasch Performance Hall provides an elegant and traditional setting for musical performances with excellent acoustics and includes a recently refurbished three-manual pipe organ. The Wells Theater is located on campus and has been recently upgraded with new high tech lighting and sound equipment. The "black box" experimental Fusion Theatre is located in downtown Monmouth and opened in 2013.

Internet connection is available in all student residences and the entire campus also has unlimited access to wireless internet. There are ten residence halls, an intercultural house, seven Greek houses, and four apartment buildings available for student use.
The campus has undergone major expansion in recent years. Bowers Hall, a premium residence hall built in 2001, was the first new dormitory in over 30 years. The college purchased and upgraded an apartment complex near the campus in 2003 and Pattee Hall, built on the north side on the campus, was completed before the Fall of 2005. Gracie Peterson Hall, a modern coed residence hall opened in the fall of 2007. The Peacock Athletic Complex was built in 2000, supplemented by a new tennis complex in 2003. It reopened the completely renovated Dahl Chapel and Auditorium containing a 600-seat English Chapel style recital hall/auditorium as well as music rehearsal space in 2003. In 2008, the April Zorn Memorial Stadium was completed, enlarging the seating capacity for football and track events to 2,600 and adding a state-of-the-art press box.

The largest building on campus is the  Huff Athletic Center. It encompasses the college's existing Glennie Gymnasium and includes a field house with indoor tennis courts and track, natatorium, fitness complex, wellness suite, locker and training rooms, classrooms and offices.
Opened in 2013 is the $40 million,  Center for Science and Business, which houses the departments of accounting, biology, chemistry, economics, mathematics & computer science, physics, psychology and political economy & commerce. The new facility introduces a cadaver lab, the Adolphson Observatory with research-grade 20-inch reflecting telescope, nuclear physics lab, two parallel computing facilities, a moot boardroom, tax preparation facilities, one-way observation labs, and an FDA-approved nutrition lab.

The college maintains a state-of-the-art digital television studio and media (computer) lab, a web-based radio station, digital classrooms, and three art galleries. The college also maintains the LeSuer Nature Preserve, a  nature preserve, the Hamilton Research Pond, a prairie grass laboratory and a riparian property on the banks of the Mississippi river for the purposes of wetland biological research.

The Ivory Quinby House, built by a founder of Monmouth College, is now the home of the President of the college and is listed on the National Register of Historic Places. Students regularly attend functions at the home, including dinners and discussion groups.

Sustainability
Monmouth College has reduced its energy consumption and has substantially increased its recycling contributions in recent years. These efforts include energy reduction through the installation of numerous new heating boilers throughout campus, the use of energy-efficient lighting, low-flow water systems and the replacement of windows in nearly all older buildings. The new Center for Science and Business includes energy efficient heating/cooling systems and heat recapture exhaust systems among many other features. Recycling efforts now extend into every student residence and office building. Some students have also committed themselves to sustainability of food production by opting to live in the college's Garden theme housing which grows its own organic food and harvests its own honey using college facilities including seven acres set aside for such use. The college also provides scholarships for students who have demonstrated leadership in sustainability prior to enrolling.

The college provides free access to bicycles for student use, and an electric vehicle recharging station is located on campus.

Study abroad and off-campus
Over seventy off-campus programs are available in over fifty countries and may run for as little as ten days or as long as a year but generally last one semester. Programs offered through the Associated Colleges of the Midwest consortium take place usually for one semester at over a dozen locales around the globe and include cultural, scientific, economic, historical and other forms of study and research. The diversity of these programs spans such topics as scientific research at Oak Ridge National Laboratory to government interning in Washington, D.C. to cultural activities in Florence, Italy. Monmouth College faculty frequently teach in these programs along with other members of the consortium including Carleton College, Grinnell College, and eleven other colleges. Other programs run exclusively by Monmouth College include a wide-ranging program in Scotland.

In 2012, four Monmouth College students studied at the Fulbright International Summer Institute in Bulgaria, accompanied by a Monmouth College Associate Dean who taught at the institute.

Hewes Library

With over a half-million items catalogued, the Hewes Library provides students access to its broad collections. Besides books and periodicals and a large interlibrary loan capability, the library also houses collections of antiquities, rare books, art, archaeology, and also computer laboratories and high-tech support. A major remodeling in 2000 has resulted in a modern open-stack facility.

Fellowships and internships
Hundreds of internships are arranged annually for students through the Wackerle Career and Leadership Center. These include public service work around the country. Students have also interned, beginning as early as the first year, opting from opportunities at such businesses as Caterpillar Inc., Deere & Co., Monsanto, law offices, medical offices, and many others. Summer internships are also available at the college in such offices as Admission, Financial Aid, Student Life, Hewes Library, Marketing communication, fundraising and others.

Summer research opportunities exist for students and also incoming freshmen and transfers in the sciences and many other areas of study. This research is conducted with professors and students working in groups and includes such varied topics such as lightning research, archaeology and music. Included are allowances for a stipend and room and board expenses.

Students and staff

Students
Students represent about 30 states and about 35 countries. Ninety-three percent of students live on campus in dormitories, theme houses, Greek housing, or apartment buildings.

Student profile
 Size: 900
 Points of origin: 28 states; 21 countries
 Diversity: 50% women; 50% men; 35% American minorities and international

Faculty profile
 Size: 133 (92 full-time, 41 part-time)
 Student-faculty ratio: 10:1
 Qualifications: 85 percent have Ph.D. or other terminal degree
 Average class size: 14

Men's fraternities
  Phi Delta Theta
  Sigma Phi Epsilon
  Alpha Tau Omega
  Zeta Beta Tau

Women's fraternities
  Alpha Xi Delta
  Pi Beta Phi (Alpha chapter founded at MC, 1867)
  Kappa Kappa Gamma (Alpha chapter founded at MC, 1870)

Coeducational fraternities
  Mu Lambda Rho (Alpha chapter founded at MC, 2013) (local)

Student groups
There are over 120 student groups that pursue various interests through student-led organizations funded by the student government or the college, including cultural, religious, publications, professional, honors, fine and performing arts, political advocacy, service groups, housing, and athletic organizations.

The honor societies at Monmouth College are:
  Alpha Lambda Delta (Freshmen Scholastic)
  Alpha Psi Omega (Theatre)
  Beta Beta Beta (Biology)
 Blue Key (Junior Service)
  Eta Sigma Phi, Gamma Omicron Chapter (Classics)
  Kappa Delta Pi (Education)
  Lambda Pi Eta, Kappa Chapter (Communication)
 Mortar Board, Tau Pi Chapter (Senior Service)
  Phi Alpha Theta (History)
  Pi Delta Phi (French)
  Pi Gamma Mu (Social Science)
  Pi Sigma Alpha (Political Science)
  Psi Chi (Psychology)
  Sigma Delta Pi (Spanish)
  Sigma Omicron Mu (Senior Scholastic)
  Sigma Tau Delta (English)
 Society of Physics Students
 American Chemical Society (Student Affiliates)

Traditions
The college's Scottish heritage is celebrated by its bagpipes and drums band that have won national titles in recent years.

The freshmen walkout is an autumn event that acquaints all the students with the town.

Scholars day held in conjunction with founders day celebrates academic achievements with a wide variety of events.

The college owns a restored civil war cannon which currently resides in the basement of their Athletic facility, the "Huff." It was once used to signal every touchdown the Fighting Scots made at homecoming football games.

Alma Mater

The Alma Mater of Monmouth College is "A Flame of White and Crimson." It was written in 1924.

A flame of White and Crimson weaves mem'ry's shadow spell,

And a thousand hearts' devotion to the school we love so well.

Thy name means honor, loyalty and beauty. Ever be

Thy strength, our strength and pride for aye.

Old Monmouth, Hail to thee!

Safety
Monmouth College's safety record rates highly among American Colleges and Universities. The college is located in a residential neighborhood of Victorian homes, removing it from the safety concerns of many urban campuses. The college provides security patrols, an emergency broadcasting system and emergency text messaging system, plus extensive security lighting and the use of some security cameras.

Fire safety is highly rated by The Princeton Review. All dormitories are equipped with sprinkler systems and smoke detectors.

Athletics
Monmouth College is a member of the Midwest Conference and the NCAA Division III. The college offers eleven varsity sports for men and eleven for women. The college has won the Midwest Conference men's all-sports trophy each of the last two years. The college also offers intramural sports.

The athletic teams' nickname, Fighting Scots, was coined in 1928 to reflect the Scotch-Irish heritage of the college's founders. "Fighting Scots" is a registered trademark of Monmouth College.

The Monmouth College men's track and field team placed third in the NCAA Division III Outdoor Track and Field Championships on May 26, 2007. It was the first national team trophy that a Monmouth College sports team has won. The following year, Monmouth's men's track and field team took second place in the NCAA Division III Indoor Track and Field Championships. Monmouth's track program has produced nine individual national champions, the most recent of which was James Wilson, who won the NCAA Division III indoor long jump national title in 2013.

In 2014, the college's sports teams and student-athletes won awards for academic achievement including national academic honors from seven different organizations. Volleyball and Men's Golf earned team academic accolades from their respective national coaches' organizations for their high team GPA. Eleven team members also earned individual national honors for their academic excellence including one student who became Monmouth's first winner of the NCAA's Elite 89 Award, given to the student-athlete with the highest GPA participating in one of the NCAA's 89 sponsored championships. Four softball players, three track student-athletes, two women's golfers and a men's tennis player also received national academic honors for the 2013–14 academic year.

Monmouth began its college football rivalry with Knox College in Galesburg in 1888, making it the sixth-oldest college football rivalry in the country. The two schools play annually for the Bronze Turkey trophy in November (originally on Thanksgiving). ESPN's Jeff Merron has classified the trophy as the fifth-most-unusual in college football. The Bronze Turkey has been stolen several times and was at one time buried under the old MC indoor track for five years. Monmouth leads the series with 71 wins, 50 losses and 10 ties.

The Monmouth College football team has appeared in the NCAA Division III Playoffs in 2005, 2008, 2009, 2011, 2016, 2017, 2019, and 2020. Monmouth's recent varsity football alumni include two former quarterbacks who went on to the National Football League. Through 2013, Alex Tanney '11 has played for Kansas City, Dallas, Cleveland, Tampa, and the New York Giants. Mitch Tanney '06 is director of analytics for the Chicago Bears.

The men's water polo team won the CWPA Division III Club National Championship in 2012.

Monmouth College was a member of the Illinois Intercollegiate Athletic Conference from 1921 to 1937.

Men's varsity teams

 Baseball
 Basketball
 Cross country
 Football
 Golf
 Indoor track
 Outdoor track
 Soccer
 Swimming
 Tennis
 Lacrosse

Women's varsity teams
 Basketball
 Cross country
 Golf
 Indoor track
 Outdoor track
 Soccer
 Softball
 Swimming
 Tennis
 Volleyball
 Lacrosse

Club and intramural athletics
Monmouth College fields over twenty club athletic teams for men and women spanning about a dozen indoor and outdoor sports. These include sand volleyball, ultimate frisbee, badminton, floor hockey, wrestling and table tennis in addition to the more traditional flag football, basketball, and softball. Some teams are co-educational.

Music

In the Monmouth College music department, majors and non-majors alike have the opportunity to perform in ensembles including Chorales, male and female a capella, Marching Band, concert bands and an orchestra. The college also has a gospel choir and provides opportunities for musical theater. The Chorale has toured extensively both nationally, visiting nearly half the states in the US, and internationally, including a recent trip to Scotland and a tour of Spain in spring, 2012. In 2013 the group performed in Carnegie Hall in New York City.

All classes, ensembles, and lessons are taught by members of the faculty, rather than by teaching assistants. The faculty are experts in their respective fields, as well as active performers.

The Music Department subsidizes some vocal ensembles.

The Kasch Performance Hall, a 600-seat concert hall and stage which is inside the Dahl Chapel, was given a $3 million restoration in 2003. Faculty offices, most lessons and classes, practice rooms, and a piano lab are located in Austin Hall, which is two blocks away.

Rankings
In 2015, Money magazine ranked Monmouth 28th out of 736 "Best Colleges" in the Most Affordable Private Colleges category. That same year, the college was ranked by Washington Monthly 38 (out of 248 top four-year institutions) in Social Mobility which included Predicted Versus Actual Graduation Rate achievement of its graduates.

The Princeton Review named Monmouth College a "Best in the Midwest" in its 2015 Best Colleges survey. Monmouth's highest ratings came in the areas of fire safety, financial aid, Interesting Professors and Accessibility of Professors.

The college is ranked 154 of 925 colleges and universities in Forbes 2015 College Financial Grades rankings of financial fitness. This ranking is based on balance sheet health, operational soundness, admissions yield, freshmen receiving institutional grants, and instructional expenses per student.

Monmouth was named to the 2013 President's Higher Education Community Service Honor Roll.

Notable alumni 

 Reid K. Beveridge 1964, Brigadier General (ret.) in the National Guard of the United States; functionary, the Presbyterian Church; and journalist
 Robert Hendricks Brink 1968, representative, Virginia House of Delegates; attorney
 Ralph Waddell Douglass 1920, award-winning artist; author of the Calligraphic Lettering style; coauthor and illustrator of the Mesaland Series of children's books
 James K. L. Duncan 1866, Medal of Honor recipient
 Robert Hugo Dunlap 1942, Major in the United States Marine Corps, Medal of Honor recipient
 Francis Louis "Jug" Earp 1921, National Football League player, Green Bay Packers; inducted into Green Bay Packers Hall of Fame; also played for the New York Yankees football team
 Dean E. Fischer 1958, Assistant Secretary of State for Public Affairs; spokesman for the United States Department of State; was a United States journalist with Time magazine
 Roger J. Fritz 1950 was a management consultant, columnist, international speaker and author of 63 management development and motivational books; 17th president of Willamette University in Oregon from 1969 to 1972
 Ann Garry 1965, founding director, Center for the Study of Genders and Sexualities and chair of the Department of Philosophy at California State University, Los Angeles; Humphrey Chair of Feminist Philosophy at the University of Waterloo; Fulbright lecturer at the University of Tokyo and at Eötvös Loránd University, Budapest
 Calvin Bryce Hoover 1922, founder of the field of comparative economic systems; noted economist and professor, Duke University; wrote The Economic Life of Soviet Russia in 1931
 Philip G. Killey 1963, United States Air Force Major General (ret.); Adjutant General, South Dakota National Guard; Director, Air National Guard; Commander, First Air Force
 William Medcalf Kinsey 1869, U.S. Representative from Missouri; circuit court judge; and attorney
 Jane Kurtz 1973, author of over 30 children's books; Golden Kite Award (best picture book text); Year's Best Children's Books (The Washington Post)
 Martha Lena Morrow Lewis 1892, national lecturer, Women's Christian Temperance Union; organizer, women's suffrage; first woman member, National Executive Committee of the Socialist Party of America
 Edgar Everett Martin 1921, cartoonist, Boots and Her Buddies, reached an audience of 700 newspapers and 60 million readers
 Robert Wilson McClaughry 1860, Warden of the United States Penitentiary at Leavenworth, Kansas and early leader in modern penal reform; General Superintendent of Police, City of Chicago
 Robert Thaddeus McLoskey 1928, U.S. Representative from Illinois; member of the Illinois House of Representatives
 Thomas H. McMichael 1886, M.A. 1889, President of Monmouth College (1903–1936); moderator, Presbyterian Church of North America (1915)
 Keith Frank Molesworth 1928, Chicago Bears football player; backfield coach, Pittsburgh Steelers; head coach, Baltimore Colts; vice president and director of personnel, Baltimore Colts
 Rachel J. Nicol 1868, a founder of Pi Beta Phi, first secret collegiate society for women patterned after men's fraternities; and a physician (M.D.)
 Danielle Nierenberg 1995, activist, author, journalist, and co-founder and president of Food Tank: The Food Think Tank
 George H. Palmer 1861, Medal of Honor recipient
 James L. Pate 1963, chairman of the board and chief executive officer, Pennzoil-Quaker State Company; Assistant Secretary of Commerce and spokesman for U.S. President Gerald R. Ford; Chairman of Board, Devon Energy Corporation; chief economist, B.F. Goodrich Company
 Harold "Red" Poling 1949, chairman and CEO, Ford Motor Company; member, Sigma Phi Epsilon Fraternity ΣΦΕ
 Robert William Porter 1949, United States chief federal judge, attorney, and mayor of Richardson, Texas
 Kennedy J. Reed 1967, Theoretical physicist, Lawrence Livermore National Laboratory (LLNL); founder of the National Physical Science Consortium (NPSC); Presidential Award for Excellence in Science, Mathematics and Engineering Mentoring; Fellow, American Physical Society; Fellow, American Association for the Advancement of Science; chairs, International Union of Pure and Applied Physics Commission on Physics for Development
 Maurice H. Rees, Medical educator and Dean of University of Colorado School of Medicine from 1925 to 1945
 James H. Rupp, Illinois state senator, mayor of Decatur, Illinois, and businessman
 Chad Simpson 1998, Micro Award-winning short and flash fiction author; Teresa A. White Award, Quiddity International Literary Journal.
 Richard Elihu Sloan 1877, Governor of Arizona Territory; Associate Justice of the Arizona Territorial Supreme Court; judge, United States District Court
 Charles A. Sprague 1910, Governor of Oregon (1939–1943); editor, and publisher of Oregon Statesman
 James Stockdale 1946, Vice Admiral, U.S. Navy; U.S. Vice-Presidential candidate; Medal of Honor recipient; President, Naval War College
 Joe Tait 1959, longtime radio voice, Cleveland Cavaliers
 Alex Tanney 2011, former NFL quarterback and current assistant coach for the Philadelphia Eagles
 Samuel Martin Thompson 1924, philosopher and author of three bestselling textbooks of Philosophy; an author of the Confession of 1967, one of the major statements of faith of the Presbyterian Church (USA)
 David Turnbull 1936, chemist, made seminal contribution to solidification theory and glass formation; elected to the National Academy of Sciences; Fellow, of the American Academy of Arts and Sciences, awarded the Japan Prize; awarded the Franklin Medal
 Jim Verraros, dance musician and actor
 Earl W. Vincent 1909, Republican U.S. Representative from Iowa's 9th congressional district; federal judge; fifth judicial district of Iowa judge; and attorney
 Helen Wagner 1938, actress and star of As the World Turns; 2004 Lifetime Achievement award, Academy of Television Arts and Sciences
 Dan Everett Waid, 1887, chief architect, Metropolitan Life Insurance Company of New York; President, New York State Board of Examiners and Registration of Architects (1915–1923); President, American Institute of Architects (AIA) (1924–26); Fellow of the American Institute of Architects
 Ilo Browne Wallace 1911, Second Lady of the United States; A founder of Pioneer Hi-Bred International; sponsor of the 
 John Findley Wallace 1872, chief engineer, Panama Canal project and Illinois Central Railroad
 William J. Winslade 1963, prolific author and research principal of philosophy, medicine, and ethics; professor of philosophy of medicine, University of Texas
 Charles F. Wishart 1894, President, College of Wooster 1921–1944; Moderator, Presbyterian General Assembly 1924
 John M. Work 1891, founding member and executive secretary of the Socialist Party of America; author.

There are about 12,600 living alumni.

See also
 Monmouth University, in West Long Branch, New Jersey, was also named Monmouth College until 1995.
 List of Concert Halls (in Illinois).

Notes

References

External links
 Official website
 Official athletics website

 
Liberal arts colleges in Illinois
Educational institutions established in 1853
Presbyterianism in Illinois
Presbyterian universities and colleges in the United States
Universities and colleges affiliated with the Presbyterian Church (USA)
Tourist attractions in Warren County, Illinois
Private universities and colleges in Illinois
1853 establishments in Illinois